Robert Graysmith (born Robert Gray Smith; September 17, 1942) is an American true crime author and former cartoonist. He is known for his work on the Zodiac killer case.

Career 
Graysmith worked as a political cartoonist for the San Francisco Chronicle in 1969, when the Zodiac killer case came to prominence. He attempted to decode letters written by the killer and became obsessed with the case over the next 13 years. Graysmith wrote two books about the case; his 1986 book Zodiac was the basis for the 2007 film by the same name. He eventually gave up his career as a cartoonist to write five more books on high-profile crimes, one of which became the basis for the film Auto Focus (2002).

Personal life 
Graysmith was married to Margaret Ann Womack, a nurse, from 1963 to 1973.  He then married Melanie Krakower in 1975, but they divorced in 1980. He directly attributes his failed marriage to his intense interest in the Zodiac case.

In popular culture
The film Zodiac (2007), directed by David Fincher, was based on his books and featured Jake Gyllenhaal as Graysmith.

Bibliography

References

External links 
 

20th-century American non-fiction writers
21st-century American non-fiction writers
1942 births
American cartoonists
Living people
San Francisco Chronicle people
Writers from Pensacola, Florida
Writers from San Francisco
Zodiac Killer